Moosa Nazim (born 2 December 1974) is a Maldivian swimmer. He competed in the men's 50 metre freestyle event at the 1996 Summer Olympics.

References

1974 births
Living people
Maldivian male swimmers
Olympic swimmers of the Maldives
Swimmers at the 1996 Summer Olympics
Place of birth missing (living people)